Charles Patrick Tully (11 July 1924 – 27 July 1971) was a Northern Irish football player and manager who played for Celtic.

External links

References 

1924 births
1971 deaths
Belfast Celtic F.C. players
Cliftonville F.C. players
NIFL Premiership players
Celtic F.C. players
Association footballers from Northern Ireland
Northern Ireland international footballers
Pre-1950 IFA international footballers
Association footballers from Belfast
League of Ireland players
League of Ireland XI players
League of Ireland managers
Scottish Football League players
Cork Hibernians F.C. players
Association football midfielders
Football managers from Northern Ireland